Phosgenite is a rare mineral consisting of lead chlorocarbonate, (PbCl)2CO3. The tetragonal crystals are prismatic or tabular in habit: they are usually colorless and transparent, and have a brilliant adamantine lustre. Sometimes the crystals have a curious helical twist about the tetrad or principal axis. The hardness is 3 and the specific gravity 6.3. The mineral is rather sectile, and consequently was earlier known as corneous lead, (German Hornblei).

Name and occurrence

The name phosgenite was given by August Breithaupt in 1820, from phosgene, carbon oxychloride, because the mineral contains the elements carbon, oxygen and chlorine.

It was found associated with anglesite and matlockite in cavities within altered galena in a lead mine at Cromford, near Matlock: hence its common name cromfordite. Crystals are also found in galena at Monteponi near Iglesias in Sardinia, and near Dundas in Tasmania. It has also been reported from Laurium, Greece; Tarnowitz, Poland; the Altai district, Siberia; the Touissit mine, near Oujda, Morocco; Sidi Amor ben Salem, Tunisia; Tsumeb, Namibia; Broken Hill, New South Wales; and Boleo, near Santa Rosalía, Baja California Sur. In the US it has been reported from the Terrible mine, Custer County, Colorado; the Stevenson-Bennett mine, Organ Mountains, Doña Ana County, New Mexico; and the Mammoth mine, Tiger, Pinal County, Arizona.

Crystals of phosgenite, and also of the corresponding bromine compound PbBr2CO3, have been prepared artificially.

References

Lead minerals
Halide minerals
Carbonate minerals
Tetragonal minerals
Minerals in space group 127
Luminescent minerals